Briccialdi is an Italian surname and can refer to:

 Giulio Briccialdi (1818–1881), flautist and composer 
 Briccialdi Flutes Italian flutes manufacturer
 7714 Briccialdi, a main-belt asteroid named after Giulio Briccialdi